Anne-Katrin Leucht is a retired German butterfly swimmer who won two silver medals at the 1974 European Aquatics Championships.

References

Living people
German female swimmers
German female butterfly swimmers
European Aquatics Championships medalists in swimming
Year of birth missing (living people)